The Hazadiah Smith House is a historic First Period house in Beverly, Massachusetts.  The 2.5-story wood-frame house was built c. 1686, probably by Hazadiah Smith, whose profession is frequently listed in contemporary records as a builder or housewright.  It is possible that he was responsible for a number of surviving First Period houses that survive in Beverly.  This particular house, which he is believed to have lived in, was built with a two cell center chimney plan, and then extended to the rear at a later date, replacing the roof and leaving the chimney protruding from the front roof slope.

The house was listed on the National Register of Historic Places in 1990.

See also
List of the oldest buildings in Massachusetts
National Register of Historic Places listings in Essex County, Massachusetts

References

Houses completed in 1686
Houses in Beverly, Massachusetts
Houses on the National Register of Historic Places in Essex County, Massachusetts
1686 establishments in Massachusetts